Candia Lomellina is a comune (municipality) in the Province of Pavia in the Italian region Lombardy, located about  southwest of Milan and about  west of Pavia.

The municipality of Candia Lomellina contains the frazione (subdivision) Terrasa.

Candia Lomellina borders the following municipalities: Breme, Casale Monferrato, Cozzo, Frassineto Po, Langosco, Motta de' Conti, Valle Lomellina.

Demographic evolution

Notable Persons of Candia Lomellina

 Antipope Alexander V, Catholic Pope 
 Giovanni Reale, philosopher

References

External links
 www.comune.candialomellina.pv.it

Cities and towns in Lombardy